Jackson Lake is in Grand Teton National Park in northwestern Wyoming. This natural lake was enlarged by the construction of the Jackson Lake Dam, which was originally built in 1911, enlarged in 1916 and rebuilt by 1989. As part of the Minidoka Project the top  of the lake is used by farmers in Idaho for irrigation purposes under water rights legislation that was enacted prior to the establishment of Grand Teton National Park. The lake is the remnant of large glacial gouging from the neighboring Teton Range to the west and the Yellowstone Plateau to the north. The lake is primarily fed by the Snake River, which flows in from the north, and empties at Jackson Lake Dam. The water of the lake averages below , even during the summer.

Numerous species of fish inhabit the lake including nonnative brown and lake trout and the native Snake River fine-spotted cutthroat trout and mountain whitefish.

There are over 15 islands in the lake, including the largest, Elk Island, and Donoho Point.

John D. Rockefeller, Jr. Memorial Parkway is located near the northern end of Jackson Lake and extends to the south entrance of Yellowstone National Park. This roadway combines with the roads in Grand Teton National Park that follow the eastern side of the lake, and provides access for boating and fishing. There are several marinas and lodges along the eastern shore such as Leeks marina, Colter Bay Village, Jackson Lake Lodge and Signal Mountain Lodge. All of these except Jackson Lake Lodge have boat access points and ramps. The western shore of Jackson Lake is primitive, with only hiking trails and a handful of primitive campground spots.

See also
List of largest reservoirs of Wyoming
 Colter Bay Lakeshore Trail (hiking trail, part of which runs along the shore of Jackson Lake)

References

Lakes of Wyoming
Reservoirs in Wyoming
Lakes of Grand Teton National Park
Minidoka Project
Reservoirs and dams in National Park Service units